The Flying Mail is a 1926 American silent action film directed by Noel M. Smith. The film stars Al Wilson, Joseph W. Girard and Kathleen Myers. The Flying Mail was one of a series of films that showcased the exploits of the air mail service.

Plot
Following a party, Sherry Gillespie (Al Wilson), a U. S. Mail flyer, awakes to find himself in a strange apartment and is shown evidence by Cleo Roberts (Carmelita Geraghty) that they were married the previous evening. Bart Sheldon (Harry von Meter), the leader of a gang, plots with a henchman to fly Sherry's aircraft and cautions Cleo not to let the pilot escape.

When Sherry escapes, however, and returns to the flying field, he is suspended by his employer. His estranged fiancée AliceKathleen Myers is heartbroken when learning about Cleo, who is scheming with Sheldon to obtain part of an inheritance that Sherry is to receive if he earns $10,000 in a year.

Following a series of fast complications, Sherry decides to clear his name. He tracks down the gang, and swinging from a motorcycle to a rope ladder, he mounts the villain's aircraft wing and fights hand-to-hand with Sheldon. He and Sheldon parachute to the ground. When the gang leader is arrested, Sherry is finally vindicated in the eyes of his fiancée and his employer.

Cast

 Al Wilson as Sherry Gillespie 
 Joseph W. Girard as Martin Hardwick 
 Kathleen Myers as Alice Hardwick 
 Carmelita Geraghty as Cleo Roberts 
 Harry von Meter as Bart Sheldon 
 Eddie Gribbon as 'Gluefoot' Jones 
 Frank Tomick as Tom Corrigan

Production
Al Wilson was not only the star of The Flying Mail but also flew as a "stunt pilot" in the film. After Wilson became a flying instructor and a short period as manager of the Mercury Aviation Company, founded by one of his students, Cecil B. DeMille, Wilson became more and more skilled in performing stunts, including wing-walking, and left the company to become a professional stunt pilot, specializing in Hollywood aviation films.

Production started on The Flying Mail in 1925 at the Antelope Valley, north of Los Angeles. Wilson had Frank Tomick, another pilot/actor in one of the supporting roles, fly the "pickup" aircraft for Wilson's stunts.

Wilson worked together with stuntmen like Frank Clarke and Wally Timm and also for film companies, including Universal Pictures. After numerous appearances in stunt roles, he started his career as an actor in 1923 with the serial The Eagle's Talons. Wilson produced his own movies until 1927, when he went back to work with Universal.

Reception
Aviation film historian Stephen Pendo, in Aviation in the Cinema (1985) said The Flying Mail was only one of a long list of aviation films that showcased Wilson's talents. He alternately wrote, acted and flew in a career that "spanned more than 10 years, and he acted in more films than any other professional pilot."

In The Flying Mail , Pendo noted the aerial stunts featured Wilson who "jumped from a motorcycle to a ladder suspended from a plane, fought a hand-to-hand battle on the plane's wing, and made a two-man, one-parachute drop – all, as a title  in the film clearly stated, with no double or trick photography."

References

Notes

Citations

Bibliography

 Munden, Kenneth White. The American Film Institute Catalog of Motion Pictures Produced in the United States, Part 1. Berkeley, California: University of California Press, 1997. .
 Pendo, Stephen. Aviation in the Cinema. Lanham, Maryland: Scarecrow Press, 1985. .
 Wynne, H. Hugh. The Motion Picture Stunt Pilots and Hollywood's Classic Aviation Movies. Missoula, Montana: Pictorial Histories Publishing Co., 1987. .

External links
 
 

1926 films
1920s action films
American action films
Films directed by Noel M. Smith
American silent feature films
Associated Exhibitors films
American black-and-white films
1920s English-language films
1920s American films
Silent action films